Teimuraz may refer to:

 Teimuraz (name), a Georgian male given name
 Teimuraz I of Kakheti (1589–1663), Georgian king
 Teimuraz II of Kakheti (1680–1762), Georgian king
 Teimuraz I, Prince of Mukhrani, ruled in 1580/1605–1625
 Teimuraz II, Prince of Mukhrani, ruled in 1668–1688
 Teimuraz of Imereti (d. 1772), Georgian king